Bifrost is a Danish rock band. The early band was considered one of the last of the Danish flower power revolution bands, and is best known for the songs Hej Maria (Hello, Maria) and Det er morgen (translated: "It's Morning"), both written and sung by keyboardist Tom Lundén. While leading Bifrost, Lundén also wrote the 1976 protest song I kan ikke slå os ihjel (translated: "You cannot kill us") as an anthem for the revolutionary hippie commune of Christiania. Founded in 1974. The early band consisted of Tom Lundén, Ida Klemann, Finn Jensen, Torben Andersen, Asger Skjold-Rasmussen, Mogens Ficher and dancer and singer Annapurna.
In 1977 Mikael Miller replaced Finn Jensen on guitar. In 1978 an additional guitarist, John Teglgaard, joined the group.
 Between 1976 and 1996, Bifrost released nine albums on the CBS and Mercury Records labels.

Discography
Bifrost, 1976 (CBS Records)  - rereleased on CD by Sony BMG Music Entertainment
Til En Sigøjner, 1977 (CBS Records) - rereleased on CD by Sony BMG Music Entertainment
Læn Dem Ikke Ud, 1979 (CBS Records)
Crazy Canary, 1980 (Mercury Records)
Kassen & Hjertet, 1981 (Mercury Records)
En Tro Kopi, 1982 (Mercury Records)
Bifrost, 1984 (Mercury Records)
Vand Jeg Kan Gå På, 1987 (It's Magic)
Hjerte Til Salg, 1996 (Columbia)

References

External links
 Bifrost official website

Danish rock music groups
Folk rock groups